Democratic Indira Congress (Karunakaran) (DIC(K)) was a political party in Kerala, India. DIC(K) was founded at a meeting in Thrissur by the K. Karunakuran faction of the Indian National Congress on 1 May 2005. Initially it was called National Congress (Indira), but the name was changed DIC(K) for registration purposes in August of the same year.

Karunakuran's son K. Muraleedharan was the party president. The party allied with the Left Democratic Front in the local elections and made success. But the party was not considered for a tie up during the state assembly elections that followed. The party could not make any impression in the elections as expected. Later, Karunakaran and Muraleedharan, along with some other party members, moved to Nationalist Congress Party. After a brief while, Karunakaran returned to Congress.

History 

The party was formed as a result of internal problems in the Congress Party. The break was preceded by much acrimony within the ruling Congress Party, due to perceived slights to Karunakaran, disregarding  his lifelong services to the party. Karuunakaran's son Muraleedharan and Kerala Congress leader T. M. Jacob were the other leaders of the party. Following its split, the DIC(K) has been warmly received into the opposition Left Democratic Front combine. This acceptance has all but guaranteed DIC(K)'s return to power as the unpopular ruling combine is likely to lose badly in the assembly elections, which are due shortly.

The party has however not been void of internal dissent. Ahead of the 2005 panchayat elections, DIC(K) aligned with the Left Democratic Front. However, ahead of the 2006 Kerala legislative assembly elections the party entered into an understanding with the United Democratic Front and All India Anna Dravida Munnetra Kazhagam to try to ensure K. Muraleedharan's victory in the assembly polls. That led to a grouping within the party forming a 'DIC(K) Left Forum'. The Forum had plans of founding a new party after the elections.

Later, DIC decided to merge with the Nationalist Congress Party (NCP) led by Sharad Pawar. This resulted in a chaos in DIC and many of the leaders of the DIC have decided to go back to the Indian National Congress. The party is defunct now.

Party flag

The party's tricolour flag had the charkha and picture of Indira Gandhi as symbols.

See also 
Indian National Congress breakaway parties
National Lawyers' Congress
Indian National Congress (R)

References

Defunct political parties in Kerala
Political parties established in 2005
2005 establishments in Kerala
Indian National Congress breakaway groups